VMayakovsky is a 2018 Russian tragedy drama film directed and written by Alexander Shein. It stars Chulpan Khamatova and Yuri Kolokolnikov.

Plot 
The film tells about the famous Russian poet Vladimir Mayakovsky, his beloved women and friends who threw him, through the prism of the present...

Cast
 Chulpan Khamatova		
 Yuri Kolokolnikov		
 Evgeniy Mironov	
 Anton Adasinsky	
 Albert Albers	
 Mikhail Efremov	
 Lyudmila Maksakova
 Maria Poezzhaeva	
 Miriam Sekhon

References

External links 
 

2010s Russian-language films
Russian documentary films
Russian biographical drama films